Estriol tripropionate (brand name Estriel), or estriol tripropanoate, is an estrogen medication. It is an estrogen ester, specifically, an ester of estriol.

See also
 List of estrogen esters § Estriol esters

References

Estriol esters
Estrogens
Propionate esters